Nice Dreams is the second album by psychedelic rock band Coke Weed. It was released on April 17, 2012. It was recorded in Bar Harbor, Maine and produced by Nick Stumpf.

Track listing
All songs copyright Milan McAlevey.
 "Pure Pattern" - 5:12
 "Sister Springs" - 3:38
 "Magpie" - 4:28
 "Jimmy" - 3:31
 "Kid" - 3:48
 "Golden Apples" - 5:14
 "Someone So Young" - 6:38
 "King of the Night" - 6:01
 "No Poem" - 4:35
 "Gangland" - 5:11

Personnel
Coke Weed
Nina Donghia - vocals
Milan McAlevey - guitar, vocals
Caleb Davis - guitar, backing vocals
Zach Soares - bass
Peter Cuffari - drums, and percussion

Additional Musicians
Emily Henry - trombone on "Someone So Young"

References

2012 albums
Coke Weed albums